Hans-Joachim Weller (born 2 July 1946) is a German former football player and manager who played as a midfielder. Besides Germany, he has played in Switzerland.

References

1946 births
Living people
Sportspeople from Kiel
German footballers
Association football midfielders
Bundesliga players
2. Bundesliga players
Swiss Super League players
Holstein Kiel II players
Holstein Kiel players
Hannover 96 players
TSV 1860 Munich players
VfB Stuttgart players
FC Zürich players
SC Young Fellows Juventus players
Neuchâtel Xamax FCS players
FC Winterthur players
German football managers
FC Wohlen managers
FC Winterthur managers
FC Vaduz managers
German expatriate footballers
German expatriate sportspeople in Switzerland
Expatriate footballers in Switzerland
Expatriate football managers in Switzerland